Jürgen Rische (born 30 October 1970) is a retired German football striker and current coach.

He played for 1. FC Lokomotive (later VfB) Leipzig, 1. FC Kaiserslautern, VfL Wolfsburg and Eintracht Braunschweig. Rische scored together more than 100 goals in Oberliga, Bundesliga and 2. Bundesliga. He was a part of the East German squad at the 1989 FIFA World Youth Championship, playing one match.

Since 2009, he works as assistant coach at Eintracht Braunschweig.

Honours
 Bundesliga: 1997–98
 DFB-Pokal: 1995–96

References

External links
 
 

1970 births
Living people
People from Oschatz
People from Bezirk Leipzig
German footballers
East German footballers
Footballers from Saxony
Association football forwards
Bundesliga players
2. Bundesliga players
1. FC Lokomotive Leipzig players
1. FC Kaiserslautern players
VfL Wolfsburg players
Eintracht Braunschweig players
Eintracht Braunschweig non-playing staff
DDR-Oberliga players